Niels Zonneveld (born 22 July 1998 in Uitgeest) is a professional Dutch darts player he currently playing in the Professional Darts Corporation (PDC) events.

He attended European Q-School in 2019, where he won his Tour Card on Day 1, beating Christian Gödl 5–1 in the final.

World Championship results

PDC
 2021: First round (lost to William O'Connor 0–3) (sets)
 2023: First round (lost to Lewy Williams 0–3) (sets)

Performance timeline

PDC European Tour

(W) Won; (F) finalist; (SF) semifinalist; (QF) quarterfinalist; (#R) rounds 6, 5, 4, 3, 2, 1; (RR) round-robin stage; (Prel.) Preliminary round; (DNQ) Did not qualify; (DNP) Did not participate; (NH) Not held; (EX) Excluded; (WD) Withdrew

References

External links

Living people
Dutch darts players
Professional Darts Corporation current tour card holders
1998 births